Zalamea de la Serena is a municipality in the province of Badajoz, Extremadura, Spain. According to the 2014 census, the municipality has a population of 3797 inhabitants.

Zalamea is the setting of the play, “El Alcalde de Zalamea,” or the “Mayor of Zalamea.”

Monuments include:  the dystile, and church called ´El Cristo.´  There is a small village called Docenario close to Zalamea.

Monuments
There is a Dystile from Roman times.  There is a castle and it is about 2,400 years old.  There are two churches from Roman times.

Nine km to the north is Cancho Roano, a temple/ritual site of the Tartessian period, now with a Visitor centre

Other buildings and facilities in Zalamea
There is a football field.  There are some sport centres.  There are some street lights.

There is a castle.  It is big and the color brown.  The castle has got two towers.

Festivals and Celebrations

There are festivals.  There is a festival called ´Romeria. 
There is a festival called ´San Cristobal and it is celebrated in the ´Charca.´  ´Charca´ is a big lake with fishing lines.

See also
La Serena

References

External links

Municipalities in the Province of Badajoz